During the 1996–97 English football season, Hartlepool United F.C. competed in the Football League Third Division.

Season summary
In the 1996–97 season, Hartlepool started the campaign with wins over Colchester United and Fulham, but Houchen's playing career came to an end after the fifth game of the season, against Wigan Athletic, when he retired due to a persistent knee injury. Houchen continued to bemoan referring decisions which seemed to consistently go against Hartlepool. This in turn led to continued punishments from the FA over his use of foul language towards officials. With Hartlepool on a poor run of results at the foot of the table, he left the club by mutual consent on 4 November 1996. His assistant Mick Tait led the club to a 20th-place finish, and organised a benefit match for Houchen against Middlesbrough, which raised £23,000.

There was also a change of ownership in 1997, when Harold Hornsey sold the club to an oil company called IOR.

Final league table

Results
Hartlepool United's score comes first

Legend

Football League Third Division

FA Cup

League Cup

Football League Trophy

Squad

References

Sources
)

Hartlepool United F.C. seasons
Hartlepool United
1990s in County Durham